Musée de la Résistance et de la Déportation may refer to:
 Musée de la Résistance et de la Déportation à Besançon
 Musée de la Résistance et de la Déportation à Grenoble